Livramento de Nossa Senhora is a municipality in the state of Bahia in the North-East region of Brazil.

Historic structures

Casa da Lagoa is a protected historic structure to the east of the city center of Livramento. It was built by José de Aquino Tanajura (1831—1918), a physician and state senator, in the middle of the 19th century.

See also
List of municipalities in Bahia

References

Municipalities in Bahia